Going Steady (Israeli: Yotzim Kavua) is a 1979 Israeli film. It is the second in the Lemon Popsicle film series.

Synopsis
The film concerns three teenage boys, Benji (Bentzi), Bobby (Momo), and Huey (Yudale). Benji falls in love with Tammy in a party. He tries to make love with her but she leaves the party. When Benji gets drunk and Huey's girlfriend, Martha, tries to sleep with him, he rebuffs her. He keeps his distance with Tammy, hoping she would be the one to apologize. Eventually, he gives up and makes up to her with the help of his friend, Huey. However, their relationship suffers when Bobby accuses Benji of cheating on his girlfriend, Tammy, with Martha. To Benji's dismay, Tammy shows up on prom with Bobby and learns that Tammy and Bobby were "screwing". He decides to leave the town with Shelly but stops when Huey tells the lie he made up about Tammy and Bobby and discovers it was him that Tammy truly loved.

Cast
 Yftach Katzur as Bentzi
 Jonathan Sagall as Momo
 Zachi Noy as Yudale
 Yvonne Miklosh as Tammy
 Rachel Steiner as Martha
 Daphna Armoni as Shelly 
 Dvora Kedar as Sonja

Reception
From contemporary reviews, Martyn Auty of The Monthly Film Bulletin declared that the film was "More offensive than its predecessor Lemon Popsicle" as it took "the opportunity to abuse women in both script and shooting with a sexism unknown to routine soft-porn. The same misogyny extends to the portrait of Benji's 'typical' Jewish mother."

References

External links
 

1979 films
Israeli teen films
Films set in Tel Aviv
Lemon Popsicle
1970s teen films
Teen sex comedy films
Films directed by Boaz Davidson
Israeli sequel films
Films produced by Menahem Golan
Golan-Globus films
Films produced by Yoram Globus
Films with screenplays by Boaz Davidson
1970s German films